European Hercules was an annual strongman contest which consisted of international athletes from various countries. The event was held annually in Finland.

Event Placings

All results courtesy of David Horne's World of Grip http://www.davidhorne-gripmaster.com/strongmanresults.html

References

Strongmen competitions